The 2004 AMA Superbike Championship is the 29th season of the AMA Superbike Championship.

Season Calendar

Superbike Season Calendar

AMA Superbike

Rider Standings

AMA Superstock

Rider Standings

AMA Formula Xtreme

Rider Standings

AMA Supersport

Rider Standings

References

AMA Superbike Championship seasons
Ama Superbike
AMA Superbike Championship